The MV Seaman Guard Ohio is a floating armory ship owned by AdvanFort and used for storing weapons and security guards on private anti-piracy contracts. In October 2013, the ship was impounded and the crew and armed guards aboard were detained after it allegedly entered Indian waters with illegal arms without adequate permission.

Ship
The MV Seaman Guard Ohio is a Sierra Leone (flag of convenience)-flagged former fishery patrol vessel (Call Sign: 9LA2125, IMO: 8410691, MMSI: 667004026) owned and operated by AdvanFort, a private maritime security company based in Virginia, US that provides commercial anti-piracy protection services to merchant vessels. The vessel is equipped with a wide array of directive and omnidirectional radio-communications sensors including numerous VHF, UHF, HF and satellite communications antennae, maritime radars and satellite navigation systems.

The ship was built for Hokkaido Prefecture by Narasaki Shipbuilding of Muroran, Japan, and was originally named the Kaio Maru. In May 2011 she was renamed Timor Navigator, and in January 2012 Seaman Guard Ohio.

History

Interception by Indian Coast Guard 

The MV Seaman Guard Ohio was intercepted on 12 October 2013 beyond the ICC CSS High Risk Area and within Indian Customs Waters by ICGS Naiki Devi. The vessel was escorted to the V.O. Chidambaranar Port in Thoothukudi (Tuticorin).  The 10 crew and 25 guards were interrogated by a federal multi-agency joint investigation team comprising members of the Indian Coast Guard, Indian Navy, Customs, Research and Analysis Wing  and the Q Branch of India's Intelligence Bureau.

On 10 July 2014, a judge of the Madras High Court dismissed the charges against the crew and armed guards, while reaffirming that the captain and the fuel vendor were liable to punishment for the ship's being refueled with subsidized diesel fuel.

On 1 July 2015, the Indian Supreme Court heard an appeal filed by the CID ‘Q’ Branch police against the 2014 judgement by the Madras High Court. Supreme Court Bench of Justices Vikramjit Sen and Abhay Manohar Sapre set aside the High Court's decision as “illegal and erroneous.” explaining that “The very fact that huge quantity of arms and ammunition were recovered from the possession of the crew members from the vessel and they were unable to satisfy their legal possession over such arms/ammunition is sufficient to attract the provisions of Arms Act,”. The Supreme Court ordered the Tuticorin District Principal Sessions Court to complete the trial of the case and give its judgment within six months.

On 11 January 2016, judge  of Tuticorin District Principal Sessions Court sentenced all the 10 crew and 25 guards to undergo 5 years of imprisonment and a fine of Rs. 3000 each.

On 27 November 2017 six British former soldiers (Nick Dunn from Ashington, Northumberland; Billy Irving from Connel, Argyll; Ray Tindall from Chester; Paul Towers from Pocklington, East Yorkshire; John Armstrong from Wigton, Cumbria; and Nicholas Simpson from Catterick, North Yorkshire) who had been imprisoned following arrest and detention in 2013 were once more acquitted, as were the 29 others arrested and detained with them. While the court's ruling is that all charges against the men be dropped, that they should be released from custody  with immediate effect and the fines already paid be refunded the authorities have not yet indicated whether or not they are minded to challenge their second acquittal, accordingly they still remain in custody.

References

International maritime incidents
Maritime incidents in 2013
Patrol vessels
India–United States relations
1984 ships
Ships built in Japan